The Red Skelton Memorial Bridge carries U.S. Route 50 over the Wabash River (across the Illinois state line) outside of Vincennes, Indiana. Red Skelton joined Indiana Gov. Matthew Welsh for the dedication of the bridge on September 3, 1963.

See also

References

Bridges completed in 1963
Vincennes, Indiana
Transportation buildings and structures in Knox County, Indiana
Road bridges in Illinois
Transportation buildings and structures in Lawrence County, Illinois
Wabash River
Road bridges in Indiana
U.S. Route 50
Bridges of the United States Numbered Highway System
1963 establishments in Indiana
1963 establishments in Illinois